Swo is a Bantu language of the Akonolinga area, Cameroon. Spellings of the name are quite variable, including So, Sso, Shwo, and Fo. One dialect has been influenced by Beti.

Demographics
Swo or Só is spoken east of Akonolinga town in the entire eastern part of Akonolinga commune (in Melan-et-Emvane canton, Nyong-et-Mfoumou department, Central Region). There are also some speakers in Messamena commune. Swo speakers are surrounded by the Beti-Fang (Mvele, Omvang, Ewondo). Swo is transitional between Beti-Fang and Meka. There were 9,000 speakers in 1992 (SIL 1992).

References

Languages of Cameroon
Makaa-Njem languages